Calivigny is a village in Grenada. It is located on the island's south coast, to the southeast of the capital, St. George's, in the Parish of Saint George.

References

Populated places in Grenada